Markus Dahlen Brændsrød (born 6 September 1995) is a Norwegian football midfielder who currently plays for Eik Tønsberg.

He started his youth career in FK Tønsberg, before being signed by Vålerenga. He played six first-tier games in 2014, but signed a two-year deal with Lillestrøm ahead of the 2015 season.

On 17 February 2016 he signed a loan deal with Strømmen.

Career statistics

References

External links

1995 births
Living people
People from Vestfold
Sportspeople from Tønsberg
Norwegian footballers
FK Tønsberg players
Vålerenga Fotball players
Lillestrøm SK players
Strømmen IF players
Sogndal Fotball players
FK Jerv players
Eik-Tønsberg players
Norwegian Third Division players
Norwegian Second Division players
Norwegian First Division players
Eliteserien players
Association football midfielders
Sportspeople from Vestfold og Telemark